Fatin Abdel Wahab (22 November 1913 – 12 May 1972) was an Egyptian film director. He directed 52 films between 1949 and 1970. His 1961 film Wife Number 13 was entered into the 12th Berlin International Film Festival. His 1965 film Driven from Paradise was entered into the 4th Moscow International Film Festival.

awards 

It won the Lion’s Share award in the list of the 100 best comedies in Egyptian cinema, and the list included 17 works, based on the selection of the Alexandria Film Festival for the Red Sea Countries and the Egyptian Association of Film Writers and Critics.

Selected filmography
 Al-Ustazah Fatimah (1952)
 Miss Hanafi (1954)
 Ismail Yassine in the Navy (1957)
 Hamido's son (1957)
 A Rumor of Love (1960)
 Wife Number 13 (1961)
 Bride of the Nile (1963)
 Driven from Paradise (1965)
 Three Thieves (1966)
 My Wife, the Director General (1966)
 My Wife's Dignity (1967)
 My Wife's Goblin (1968)
 Land of Hypocrisy (1968)

References

External links

1913 births
1972 deaths
Egyptian film directors
People from Damietta